Alexis Pizarro is a paralympic athlete from Puerto Rico competing mainly in category F58 throwing events.

Alexis competed in all three throws at both the 2000 Summer Paralympics, as an F57 athlete and the 2004 Summer Paralympics as an F58 athlete.  He won a bronze in the shot put in 2000 and in the discus in 2004.  He also competed in the shot put in Beijing in 2008 but could only manage 12th.

References

Paralympic athletes of Puerto Rico
Puerto Rican shot putters
Athletes (track and field) at the 2000 Summer Paralympics
Athletes (track and field) at the 2004 Summer Paralympics
Athletes (track and field) at the 2008 Summer Paralympics
Paralympic bronze medalists for Puerto Rico
Living people
Medalists at the 2000 Summer Paralympics
Medalists at the 2004 Summer Paralympics
Year of birth missing (living people)
Paralympic medalists in athletics (track and field)
Medalists at the 2007 Parapan American Games
Wheelchair discus throwers
Wheelchair javelin throwers
Wheelchair shot putters
Paralympic discus throwers
Paralympic javelin throwers
Paralympic shot putters